Paraguayan Petroleums ( or Petropar) is the Paraguayan national oil company that owns the only refinery in the country, Villa Elisa Refinery, which is located in Villa Elisa, and which has a capacity of , a LNG plant, a biodiesel plant and several storage facilities with a storage capacity of around .

References

External links
 Official Petróleos Paraguayos website—

Oil and gas companies of Paraguay
Paraguay
Non-renewable resource companies established in 1981
1981 establishments in Paraguay